Gaya Station is a station on the Busan Metro Line 2 in Gaya-dong, Busanjin District, Busan, South Korea. The station is unrelated to the Gaya Station which used to be operated by Korail.

External links

  Cyber station information from Busan Transportation Corporation

Busan Metro stations
Busanjin District
Railway stations in South Korea opened in 1999